Sarah Young may refer to:

Sarah Young (field hockey) (born 1981), Australian field hockey player
Sarah Young (DJ) (born 1989), British DJ
Sarah Young (immunologist), New Zealand immunology academic
Sarah Palmer Young (1830–1908), regimental nurse during the American Civil War
Sarah Hanson-Young (born 1981), Australian politician
Sarah Jane Young (1866–1955), Australian political reformer
Sarah Young (sailor) (died 2015), died in  the 2015–16 Clipper Round the World Yacht Race 
Sarah Young, Presbyterian writer, author of Jesus Calling
Sarah Young, former member of experimental indie rock band Cloud Cult